The Dorados de Chihuahua (Chihuahua Golden) is a Mexican professional basketball team based in Chihuahua, Chihuahua, Mexico playing in the East Division of the Liga Nacional de Baloncesto Profesional (LNBP). Their home arena is the Gimnasio Manuel Bernardo Aguirre. The president is Anwar Elias Ortiz.

Players

Current roster

Notable players

  D. J. Cooper

External links
Dorados de Chihuahua official site
Liga Nacional de Baloncesto Profesional

Basketball teams in Mexico
Sports teams in Chihuahua City
Basketball teams established in 2000
2000 establishments in Mexico